B-Daman Crossfire, known in Japan as , is the first B-Daman anime of the Cross Fight series and the seventh B-Daman anime series, overall. Premiering on October 2, 2011 in Japan, it became the first B-Daman anime to air in almost five years, and first to be produced in 16:9 widescreen, following the finale of Crash B-Daman on December 25, 2006. Its last episode, Conclusion! Cross Fight's New Era aired on September 30, 2012 in Japan. A sequel series, B-Daman Fireblast, premiered the following week.

On June 8, 2013, it was announced that B-Daman Crossfire would air on Disney XD Malaysia.

It was scheduled for a tentative release across global markets outside of Asia in September 2013. Starting August 17, 2013, English dubbed episodes of B-Daman Crossfire started airing on The CW's Saturday morning block, Vortexx. The series later began airing in Canada on YTV on September 7, 2013, subsequently premiering on YTV's sister channel, Nickelodeon on October 18, 2013.

The anime currently reruns on Primo TV.

History
On June 3, 2011, toy giant, Takara-Tomy revealed that a new anime series to be based on the latest revival of the B-Daman toys, Cross Fight B-Daman, was green-lit for fall 2011. Slated to premiere on October 2, 2011 through Japanese television network, TV Tokyo and other channels as previous B-Daman anime have. Set on time, the anime aired on the 8:45 AM JST time-slot, Sunday morning following an airing of Metal Fight Beyblade 4D.

26 episodes were ordered but due to the growing popularity of the Cross Fight B-Daman toyline, an additional serving of 26 episodes aired. This brought the anime up to 52 episodes, around the ideal number for toy-based anime. While the series concluded on September 30, 2012, its sequel premiered the following week.

On September 28, 2012, d-rights created a promotional poster for use at a trade show. Showcasing a preliminary English logo concept, d-rights was seeking possible companies and networks interested in licensing the anime abroad. Not long after on October 18, 2012, the trade show turned out a success with dub the series in English and other languages, as well. An international name of "B-Daman Crossfire" was chosen along with a tentative release for autumn 2013.

Much later on April 8, 2013, d-rights neared completion in negotiations with Hasbro for release outside of Asia. To compensate for this, d-rights' parent, Mitsubishi, opened up a dubbing company specialized for international dubs called, SUNRIGHTS INC. Based in Albany, New York in the USA, they  dubbed CrossFire in English with general releases in September 2013.

Synopsis

B-Daman Crossfire follows Riki Ryugasaki, an absent-minded young boy who eventually discovers a particular game called B-Daman, which involves using animal-looking figures to shoot marbles at targets. One day, he helps his friend with a tournament, and as a result, he receives a B-Daman of his own named Thunder Dracyan.

After learning about secret tournaments held at different locations, Ricky decides to attend one, and as a result, gets deeply involved with the game, as well as gaining new rivals.

As a result, Ricky divulges himself more into the sport of Cross Fight by learning the various new game types, mechanics, and such as he plans to learn the secrets of B-Daman. At the same time, he meets new friends and enemies/rivals during the game.

Characters

East block
 / Riki Ryugasaki (in the English anime)

A B-Shot who belongs to the East Block. His B-Daman is the power type Thunder Dracyan. He is a cheerful, modern boy who aspires to become an adventurer. Originally he did not have much interest in B-Daman, but then he gets his partner, Dracyan, through a chance encounter.

 / Kaito Samejima

An energetic, cheery B-Shot who belongs to the East Block. His B-Daman is the rapid-fire type Lightning Fin. Since he has lived abroad, he has a straightforward and open personality. He enjoys entertaining the spectators with flashy, “charming plays,” like his impressive one-handed rapid-fire.

 / Grizz Sukino (in the English anime)

A wild B-Shot who belongs to the East Block. His B-Daman is the power type Thunder Bearga. He demolishes the targets with powerful plays that utilize his large physic. He is an athletic type who is usually calm and kind, but when it comes to competing he gets more excited than anyone and has a strong sense of justice.

 / Yuki Washimura (in the English anime)

A B-Shot with an enormous appetite. Born in West City and a West Block B-Shot, he moved to East Block when his parents started to open restaurant at East City.

 / Simon Sumiya (in the English anime)

A rich B-Shot from a wealthy family who belongs to the East Block. His B-Daman is the rapid-fire type Lightning Scorpio. Proud and arrogant, he sees Riki as a rival and is constantly coming up with devious tricks and tactics. However, he is really an endearing character who is also very shy and fearful of girls.

West block
 / Samuru Shigami (in the English anime)

The top B-Shot in the West Block. His B-Daman is the rapid-fire type Lightning Dravise, voiced in English by Dave Mallow. Contrary to Riki, he is cool and reserved. He is proud and has a sharp mind. He is a boy of many mysteries who makes no attempt to open up to any of the other B-Shots. He senses some sort of power in Riki that is different from the other B-Shots. Though he does not think much of Riki at first, he eventually starts to consider him a rival.

 / Reggie Mak (in the English anime)

The number two B-Shot in the West Block. His B-Daman is the precision type Strike Cobra. He is a street smart bad-boy who never lets his target escape once he has it in his sniper-like sights. In his block, he considers Samuru his rival.

 / Hugo Raidoh (in the English anime)

A West Block B-Shot. His B-Daman, Thunder Leo, excels at the “Spin Shot.” Calling himself as the "King of 1 Beasts," he is a hot-blooded B-Shot who shocks onlookers with his wild howls and unconventional behavior. He gets along well with Derek.

South block
 / Novu Moru (in the English anime)

Formerly a top B-Shot in the South Block. His B-Daman, Strike Dragren, excels at precision shots. His play style is logical and calm. He uses strategy and intellect to analyze the situation and control his opponent.

 / Alba Cocodoro (in the English anime)

His B-Daman, Lightning Diles, excels at rapid-fire. He is a B-shot who lives in a village along the South Tamazon River in the jungles outside of South City. He is a descendant of the Cocodoro family, guardians of the ancient B-Daman civilization. After meeting Riki and the others, he leaves his village to help them.

 / Derek Watari (in the English anime)

Formerly a top B-Shot in the South Block. His B-Daman, Supreme Tigare, excels at both precision and rapid-fire. He used to rule the South Block as the “Boss of the South.” He is a troublemaker with a rough and careless manner. He respects and follows Novu Moru.

North block
 / Basara Kurochi (in the English anime)

A B-Shot hailing from the North Block. His B-Daman, Double Drazeros, is a special type that can fire two shots at once. A delinquent living in North City, he joined Crossfire after he met Drazeros. He has a violent nature and wants to destroy all other B-Daman.

 / Asuka Kami (in the English anime)

A B-Shot hailing from the North Block. His B-Daman, Drift Jaku, can fire the irregular Curve Shot. He is a charismatic, but narcissistic, child model with a strong sense of beauty. He always carries a folding fan.

 / Gunner Arano (in the English anime)

A B-Shot hailing from the North Block. His B-Daman, Thunder Bison, can deliver a super-charged Power Shot. A famous football player in North City with trademark dreadlocks, he is also Basara’s childhood friend.

Central
 / Rudy Sumeragi (in the English anime)

Has the ultimate B-Daman, Smash Dragold, which combines all four types: power, rapid-fire, precision, and special. He started B-Daman because he wanted to be like Riki, but becomes possessed by Dragold in the Ruins of North Sumadora. When he takes Dragold, his personality completely changes. Acting with the arrogance of a king and using overwhelming power, he drives Crossfire to the verge of ruin.

WBMA staff
Tenpouin Ruri (天宝院 ルリ(てんぽういん るり)) / Rory Takakura

A female Cross Fight staff member who sometimes wearing bunny ears.

Tenpouin Saneatsu (天宝院 実篤(てんぽういん さねあつ)) / Takakura

Rori's grandfather.

Shirogane Gennosuke (白銀 弦之助(しろがね げんのすけ))

Samaru's father.

B-Da RYU (ビーダRYU) / Announcer

A Cross Fight match announcer.

Other person

Riki's female friend who has a crush on him.

The owner of Miracle Shot B-Daman shop.

Alba's grandfather.

TBA

 / Miss Yamashiro
A female teacher from Kakeru's class.

 / 
Takeru's friend from the comic book version of Cross Fight B-Daman.

References

External links
The B-Daman Wiki Forums, a community dedicated to B-Daman 
B-Daman Crossfire portal
TV Tokyo page
Hasbro B-Daman Crossfire TV page

Animated television series about children
B-Daman
Japanese children's animated action television series
Japanese children's animated adventure television series
TV Tokyo original programming
Shōnen manga
Comics based on toys
Television shows based on toys